Poker Faces is a 1926 American silent comedy film directed by Harry A. Pollard starring Edward Everett Horton and Laura La Plante. It  was produced and released by Universal Pictures.

The film is preserved at George Eastman House Motion Picture Collection, The Library of Congress, and UCLA Film and Television Archive.

Cast
Edward Everett Horton as Jimmy Whitmore
Laura La Plante as Betty Whitmore
George Siegmann as George Dixon
Tom Ricketts as Henry Curlew
Tom O'Brien as Pug
Dorothy Revier as Pug's Wife
Leon Holmes as Office Boy

References

External links

Lobby poster

1926 films
American silent feature films
Universal Pictures films
Films directed by Harry A. Pollard
American black-and-white films
Silent American comedy films
1926 comedy films
1920s American films